Brenthia melodica is a species of moth of the family Choreutidae. It was described by Edward Meyrick in 1922. It is found in Fiji.

References

Brenthia
Moths described in 1922